The Floor Burns (Spanish: Quema el suelo) is a 1952 Spanish drama film directed by Luis Marquina and starring Annabella, Tomás Blanco and Gérard Tichy. It was the French actress Annabella's final film.

Plot

Cast 
 Annabella as Mari Luz Hurtado 
 Tomás Blanco as Rafael 
 Rafael Calvo as Don Alberto Hurtado 
 Gérard Tichy as Eduardo Behovia 
 Maritina Zayas as Maribel Hurtado 
 Raúl Cancio as Carlos Peñaranda 
 Nicolás D. Perchicot as Fray Jerónimo 
 Mario Berriatúa as Javier 
 Margarita Alexandre as Alicia 
 Santiago Rivero as Fiscal 
 Miguel Pastor as Abogado 
 Carlos Díaz de Mendoza as Federico Eslo 
 Mary Lamar as Titina Olaya

References

Bibliography
 De España, Rafael. Directory of Spanish and Portuguese film-makers and films. Greenwood Press, 1994.
 Jonathan Driskell. The French Screen Goddess: Film Stardom and the Modern Woman in 1930s France. I.B.Tauris, 2015.

External links 

1952 films
1952 drama films
Spanish drama films
1950s Spanish-language films
Films directed by Luis Marquina
Spanish black-and-white films
1950s Spanish films